Notodden Public Transport Terminal is a bus station opened in 2002, and between 2004 and 2015 also a railway station, serving Notodden, Norway. Traditionally located on the Bratsberg Line, it was since 2008 been regarded as part of the Tinnoset Line. The station has only one track and one platform, and was served by hourly trains to Grenland by NSB. From 10 August 2015 until 12 December 2020, the rail traffic was moved back to Notodden New Station.  However, from the introduction of the new timetable on 13 December, this station came back into use.

History
Notodden Old Station was the first station to serve Notodden, and was taken into use when Tinnoset Line opened in 1909. When the extension line of the Bratsberg Line was opened in 1917 Notodden New Station was taken into use. After operations on the Tinnoset Line were terminated in 1991, plans to move the station closer to town were made, and in 2004 the new public transport terminal was taken into use. This station is  closer to town than the old one, but the final stretch is not electrified like the rest of Bratsberg- and Tinnoset Line.

References

Railway stations on the Bratsberg Line
Railway stations on the Tinnoset Line
Railway stations in Notodden
Railway stations opened in 2004
2002 establishments in Norway
Bus stations in Norway